The Democratic Party (PD) was a Christian-democratic political party in Andorra. Its final election was the 2001 Andorran parliamentary election.

History
The party was established in the run-up to the 2001 elections when the National Democratic Group split in two, with the Social Democratic Party also being formed. The new party received 22.7% of the vote and won five seats.

Thereafter, the party did not contest any further elections.

References

Defunct political parties in Andorra
Political parties with year of establishment missing
Political parties with year of disestablishment missing